Kawakawa railway station was a station on the Opua Branch in New Zealand.

References

Defunct railway stations in New Zealand